William Horsley (18 November 177412 June 1858) was an English musician. His compositions were numerous, and include amongst other instrumental pieces three symphonies for full orchestra. More important are his glees, of which he published five books (1801–1807) besides contributing many detached glees and part songs to various collections. His glees include "By Celia's Arbour," "O, Nightingale," and "Now the storm begins to lower", and his hymn tunes Horsley usually set to There is a green hill far away.

History
In 1790, Horsley became the pupil of Theodore Smith, who taught him sufficiently well to obtain the position of organist at Ely Chapel, Holborn, in 1794. He resigned this post in 1798 to become the organist at the Asylum for Female Orphans as well as the assistant to John Wall Callcott, with whom he had long been on terms of personal and artistic intimacy, and whose eldest daughter, Elizabeth Hutchins Callcott, he married. In 1802 he became his friend's successor upon the latter's resignation.  Besides holding this appointment he became the organist of Belgrave Chapel, Halkin Street, in 1812 and of the Charter House in 1838.

Horsley studied in Germany under Moritz Hauptmann and Felix Mendelssohn, and on his return to England composed several oratorios and other pieces. None of them had lasting success.

Family
The Horsley family were friendly with Mendelssohn and, according to L T C Rolt, were the first to hear his music for A Midsummer Night's Dream, played by him on the piano at their home at No 1 High Row (now 128 Church Street) in Kensington. Horsley was one of the founders of the Philharmonic Society of London, which became the Royal Philharmonic Society. His son Charles Edward also enjoyed a certain reputation as a musician.  Another son John Callcott was a painter, who is reputed to have designed the first Christmas card in 1843.  Horsley's eldest daughter Mary Elizabeth (born 1813) married the engineer Isambard Kingdom Brunel.

References

External links

Papers of the Horsley family, 18th–20th cent.

1774 births
1858 deaths
English classical composers
Glee composers
Burials at Kensal Green Cemetery
English male classical composers
William Horsley family